Gog Tappeh (also known as Gog Tape, Gog Tappeh, Gök Tappeh, Guytapeh, and Perilship) is a village in Gowg Tappeh Rural District, in the Central District of Bileh Savar County, Ardabil Province, Iran. At the 2006 census, its population was 1,678, in 374 families.

References 

Towns and villages in Bileh Savar County